Charles Muhangwa Kitwanga (born 27 September 1960) is a Tanzanian CCM politician and Member of Parliament for Misungwi constituency since 2010. He served as a minister of internal and home affairs in the Magufuli cabinet for five months beginning in December 2015. Kitwanga was found drunk during a parliamentary session on 20 May 2016 and was immediately suspended for drinking during working hours.

References

1960 births
Living people
Chama Cha Mapinduzi MPs
Tanzanian MPs 2010–2015
Tanzanian MPs 2015–2020
Deputy government ministers of Tanzania
Same Secondary School alumni
Tosamaganga Secondary School alumni
University of Dar es Salaam alumni
Alumni of the University of Essex